The Grattan Massacre, also known as the Grattan Fight, was the opening engagement of the First Sioux War, fought between United States Army and Lakota Sioux warriors on August 19, 1854. It occurred east of Fort Laramie, Nebraska Territory, in present-day Goshen County, Wyoming.

A small detachment of soldiers entered a large Sioux encampment to arrest a man accused of taking a migrant's cow, although such matters by treaty were to be handled by the US Indian Agent. After one of the soldiers fatally shot Chief Matȟó Wayúhi (Conquering Bear), the Brulé Lakotas returned fire and killed a total of 29 soldiers, Lieutenant John Grattan, and a civilian interpreter. The massacre, as it was called by the American press, is considered an early and significant event in the Plains Indian Wars.

Background
In the late summer of 1854, about 4,000 Brulé and Oglala were camped near Fort Laramie, in accordance with the terms of the Treaty of 1851. On August 17, a cow belonging to a Mormon traveling on the nearby Oregon Trail strayed and was killed by a visiting Miniconjou (Sioux)  named High Forehead.

Lt. Hugh Fleming, the senior officer of the small garrison, consulted with the chief, Matȟó Wayúhi or Conquering Bear, to discuss the loss of livestock. Lt. Fleming was evidently unaware, or chose to ignore, that such matters were, by the terms of the Treaty of 1851, to be handled by the local Indian Agent, in this case John Whitfield. He was due to arrive within days with annuities with which restitution could be made.

Aware that the matter was not under the purview of the military, Conquering Bear still attempted to negotiate, offering a horse from his personal herd or a cow from the tribe's herd.  The cow's owner persisted in demanding $25 instead. Lt. Fleming asked the Sioux to arrest High Forehead and deliver him to the fort, which Conquering Bear refused; he had no authority over the Miniconjou and did not want to violate his people's tradition of hospitality. The day's talk ended in stalemate.

On August 19, 1854, Second Lieutenant John Lawrence Grattan, of the U.S. 6th Infantry Regiment, a recent graduate of West Point and supernumerary waiting for a vacancy in the regiment, led an armed detachment into the Indian encampment to take custody of High Forehead and bring him back to the fort. Grattan was inexperienced and described as contemptuous of the Lakotas' ability as warriors. This was his first (and only) encounter with the Sioux.

A commander at Laramie later recalled, "There is no doubt that Lt. Grattan left this post with a desire to have a fight with the Indians, and that he had determined to take the man at all hazards." In Grattan's party were a sergeant, a corporal, 27 privates and a French-Indian interpreter named Lucien Auguste; the military forces had two artillery pieces in addition to arms.

Events

By the time the detachment reached the encampment, Auguste was intoxicated from drinking along the way, as he feared the encounter.  Grattan broke his bottle and scolded him. Auguste was not well liked by the Sioux; he spoke only broken Dakota, and had little grasp of other dialects. As they entered the encampment, he began to taunt the Sioux, calling their warriors women, and saying the soldiers were not there to talk, but to kill them all. James Bordeaux, who owned the nearby trading post and observed the encounter, later recounted Auguste's comments.

Historians estimate the encampment had some 1,200 warriors among the total 4,800 population. According to Bordeaux, Lt. Grattan began to realize the risk. He stopped to discuss the situation with the trader. Bordeaux advised him to talk directly with Conquering Bear and let him handle the situation. Grattan seemed to understand and continued on into the encampment. Going first to the lodge of High Forehead, he ordered him to surrender to the US forces. High Forehead said he would die first.

Grattan went to Conquering Bear, saying the Sioux should arrest the guilty party and turn him over. Conquering Bear refused but tried to negotiate, offering a horse as compensation for the cow. Bordeaux reportedly said the interpreter Auguste taunted the Sioux, and failed to fully or accurately translate Conquering Bear and Grattan's comments, as there seemed to be confusion between them. Conquering Bear asked for the trader Bordeaux to act as interpreter, as the Sioux trusted him and his language ability.  Called by the Sioux, Bordeaux rode to the meeting place; later he said he could see the situation was out of hand. As Grattan pressed Conquering Bear, numerous Sioux warriors moved into flanking positions around the soldiers. Bordeaux returned to the trading post, where he told associates to arm themselves, as a fight was brewing.

Ending the discussion, Grattan began walking back to his column. A nervous soldier fired his gun, shooting a Sioux. The warriors started shooting arrows while leaders tried to take control. Conquering Bear was mortally wounded and died nine days later near the Niobrara River. The Sioux warriors quickly killed Grattan, 11 of his men, and the interpreter. A group of some 18 soldiers retreated on foot trying to reach some rocks for defense, but they were cut off and killed by warriors led by Red Cloud, a rising war chief within the Sioux. One soldier survived the massacre but later died of his wounds.

Conquering Bear was the only Lakota who was killed.  The Sioux spared Bordeaux, both because he was married to a Brulé Sioux woman, and he had a friendly relationship with the tribes.

Aftermath

The enraged warriors "rampaged throughout the night, swearing to attack other whites." They rode against Fort Laramie the next morning but withdrew; they looted the trading post but did not harm Bordeaux.  On the third day after the US attack, the Brûlé and Oglala abandoned the camp on the North Platte River and returned to their respective hunting grounds.  On the fourth day, the military asked Bordeaux to arrange a burial party.  His team went to the scene and found that the slain soldiers had been ritually mutilated. Grattan's body was identified by his watch and was returned to the post for burial.  The remains of the troops were interred at the site in a mass shallow grave.

The soldiers' remains were later exhumed and re-interred at Fort McPherson National Cemetery, where a white marble monument was erected in their memory.  Grattan's remains were moved later and reinterred to Fort Leavenworth National Cemetery in Kansas. A historical marker was later erected about one-half mile from the site of the events (see photo above.)

The U.S. press called the event the "Grattan Massacre." Accounts generally ignored the US soldiers' instigation of the event by their failure first, to leave it up to the Indian agent to settle, as called for in the treaty, and second, shooting chief Conquering Bear in the back. When news of the fight reached the War Department, officials started planning retaliation to punish the Sioux.  Secretary of War Jefferson Davis characterized the incident as "the result of a deliberately formed plan."

Col. William S. Harney was recalled from Paris in April 1855 and sent to Fort Kearny, where he assembled a command of 600 troops, consisting of men from the 6th Infantry, 10th Infantry, 4th Artillery, and his own 2nd US Dragoons. In all he had four mounted companies led by Lt. Col. Philip St. George Cooke and five companies of infantry under Major Albemarle Cady.  They set out on August 24, 1855, to find the Sioux and exact retribution. Harney was quoted as saying, "By God, I'm for battle—no peace."

Warned by Thomas S. Twiss of the Indian Bureau that the army had put a force in the field, half of the Lakota camped north of the Platte went into Fort Laramie for protection as "friendlies". The other half, generally led by Conquering Bear's successor Little Thunder, remained at large. They considered themselves peaceful but knew that Harney was out with a force. They continued to harbor warriors sought by the army.  Harney engaged them in the Battle of Ash Hollow (also known as the Battle of Bluewater Creek) on September 3, 1855. U.S. soldiers killed 86 Brulé Sioux, half of them women and children, in present-day Garden County, Nebraska. The New York Times and other newspapers recounted the battle as a massacre because so many women and children were killed. The village of 230 persons was caught between an assault by the infantry and a blocking force by the cavalry.

Harney returned to Fort Laramie with 70 prisoners, most of them women and children.  On October 25 the three warriors sought by the expedition surrendered, were held for a year at Fort Leavenworth, and were released.  Harney ordered the tribes to send representatives to a treaty council at Fort Pierre in March 1856, where a treaty was signed on terms dictated by the War Department. Twiss tried to undermine the treaty, and Harney had him removed from office, although he did not have the authority to do so.  Commissioner of Indian Affairs George W. Manypenny successfully lobbied the Senate to reject the treaty, and Twiss was reinstated. Harney's actions against the Lakota restrained them for nearly ten years. The US was soon involved in the American Civil War, and did not have resources to fight on the Great Plains.

Historians such as Griske believe the following nearly quarter-century of intermittent warfare on the Great Plains was triggered by the Grattan massacre. Others suggest numerous factors, especially US desire for control of lands that were Sioux territory, that contributed to make warfare inevitable.

See also
 List of battles won by Indigenous peoples of the Americas
List of massacres in Wyoming

Notes
Footnotes

Citations

References

 Ambrose, Stephen E. (1996). - Crazy Horse and Custer, New York: Random House (First Anchor Books Edition), pp. 61–64.
 Lt. John Grattan and the First Sioux War

Conflicts in 1854
1854 in the United States
Battles involving the Sioux
Battles involving the United States
Pre-statehood history of Wyoming
Sioux Wars
Native American history of Nebraska
American frontier
Nebraska Territory
August 1854 events